Stephen Henry Dowden (February 24, 1929 – January 24, 2001) was an American former player in the National Football League.

Biography
Dowden was born Stephen Henry Dowden in 1929 in Natchitoches, Louisiana.

Career
Dowden was drafted in the tenth round of the 1952 NFL Draft by the Detroit Lions and played that season at Tackle with the Green Bay Packers. He played at the collegiate level at Baylor University.

See also
List of Green Bay Packers players

References

1929 births
2001 deaths
American football tackles
Baylor Bears football players
Green Bay Packers players
Players of American football from Louisiana
Sportspeople from Natchitoches, Louisiana